Jason Critchley (born 7 December 1970) is an English former professional rugby league and rugby union footballer who played the 1980s, 1990s and 2000s. He played representative rugby league for Great Britain at every age level from under 16's, 19's and 21's. He was also selected for England, Wales and Great Britain on the tour to Papua New Guinea, Fiji and New Zealand in 1996.

Personal Information
Critchley was born in St Helens, Lancashire, England.

Playing career
Critchley was the 1993 Salford Red Devils, 1996 Keighley Cougars and 1997 Castleford Tigers season's top try scorer. In 1996 Jason broke a 90+ year record for Keighley Cougars scoring 6 tries in on match v's Widnes Vikings.

Critchley won caps for Wales while at Keighley, Castleford, and Whitehaven 1996...2001 10(11?)-caps 1(2?)-try 4(8?)-points.

Critchley was a Wales international and played at the 2000 Rugby League World Cup.

References

External links
(archived by web.archive.org) Statistics at thecastlefordtigers.co.uk
(archived by web.archive.org) Profile at Newport RFC (blackandambers.co.uk)
(archived by web.archive.org) The Teams: Wales
Hunte signs for Ponty
England too strong for brave Wales
Hull put the bite on Wildcats
A game of two codes
Wales win sets up Aussie showdown
Rugby League World Cup quarter finals - in pictures
Harris named in Wales squad
Saints hold Wales' World Cup hopes
Newport RFC : 1998/9 Season Summary

1970 births
Living people
Caerphilly RFC players
Castleford Tigers players
England national rugby league team players
English rugby league players
Footballers who switched code
Keighley Cougars players
Leicester Tigers players
Newport RFC players
Rugby league centres
Rugby league players from St Helens, Merseyside
Rugby league wingers
Salford Red Devils players
Wakefield Trinity players
Wales national rugby league team players
Whitehaven R.L.F.C. players
Widnes Vikings players